Michele Coltellini (1480–1542) was an Italian painter, active mainly in Ferrara.

Biography
He was a follower of Panetti and Garofalo, who lived in the 16th century. He is the author of a 'Dead Christ on the lap of the Virgin' in the Dresden Gallery, formerly assigned to Squarcione. His oldest panel is dated 1502, and represents the Death of the Virgin: it is now in the possession of Count Mazza, at Ferrara. In the church of Sant'Andrea, in the same city, is a Virgin and Child between SS Michael, Catharine, John, and Jerome, signed and dated 1506. The Gallery of Ferrara has a Madonna and Child and Saints, signed by him in 1542. The dates of his birth and death are uncertain.

References

Attribution:

External links
 Works by Michele Coltellini at Census of Ferrarese Paintings and Drawings 

1480 births
1542 deaths
15th-century Italian painters
Italian male painters
16th-century Italian painters
Painters from Ferrara